Ken Niles (December 9, 1906 – October 31, 1988) was an American radio announcer. Niles was born in Livingston, Montana. He was married to Nadia Niles, and had two children, Kenneth Niles and Denise Niles. His brother, Wendell Niles, was also a radio announcer. 

Niles debuted in radio on KJR in Seattle, Washington, late in the 1920s. He began a series of original radio dramas called Theater of the Mind in 1928. Niles subsequently narrated, or served as announcer, in several other feature films.  His most notable film role was the murdered lawyer Leonard Eels in Out of the Past (1947) with Robert Mitchum.

Niles also served as commercial announcer and foil for Bing Crosby in the Bing Crosby Entertains series (1933-1935) and also on several series sponsored by Camel Cigarettes, notably The Abbott and Costello Show.  Niles was frequently paired in comedy skits opposite Elvia Allman as his fictitious wife Mrs Niles. Niles was also the announcer for The Amazing Mrs. Danberry.

For his work in radio, he received a star on the Hollywood Walk of Fame, as did his brother, making them the first brothers to be so honored. Ken Niles' star is at 6711 Hollywood Avenue, in the Radio section. It was dedicated February 8, 1960.

Filmography

References

External links 

1906 births
1988 deaths
20th-century American male actors
American male film actors
American male radio actors
American male television actors
People from Livingston, Montana
Radio and television announcers